Galina Olegovna Voskoboeva (born 18 December 1984) is a Russian-born Kazakhstani former tennis player. She reached a career-high singles ranking of world No. 42 on 7 May 2012. Her best ranking in doubles is No. 26, achieved on 20 August 2012.

Professional career
Born in Moscow, Voskoboeva turned pro in 2002. During her career, she has won five doubles titles on the WTA Tour, as well as three singles titles (in Mont-de-Marsan in 2003, Cuneo in 2006, and Casablanca in 2011) and 13 doubles titles on the ITF Circuit.

2008–2010
In 2008, Voskoboeva managed to qualify for the Qatar Open in Doha. In the first round she defeated Eleni Daniilidou before taking a set off world No. 5, Maria Sharapova, but losing 4–6, 6–4, 1–6. That same year, she reached the quarterfinals in Quebec City. In 2009, she reached the quarterfinals in Warsaw. At the US Open, she lost in the first round to Caroline Wozniacki, in straight sets.

2011

Ranked 560 in the world, Galina reached the quarterfinals of the Pattaya Open. Due to her ranking, she had to qualify, and did so by defeating top seed Sania Mirza, and No. 7 seed Lindsay Lee-Waters in the qualifying tournament. In the first round of the main draw, she defeated Romina Oprandi before defeating No. 3 seed Maria Kirilenko in a close match 1–6, 7–5, 6–4.

She qualified for the Miami Open and upset the No. 7 seed, Jelena Dokic, in the first round.

At the Baku Cup Voskoboeva lost to Ksenia Pervak in the semifinals. In doubles, Voskoboeva and Niculescu were the first seeds. They advanced to the finals by defeating Daniela Dominikovic and Noppawan Lertcheewakarn, but lost to second seeds Mariya Koryttseva and Tatiana Poutchek.

After qualifying for the Premier-level Canadian Open in Toronto, Voskoboeva recorded the biggest win of her career by defeating French Open-semifinalist and world No. 9, Marion Bartoli in the first round. She followed this up with a win against world No. 25, Flavia Pennetta to reach the third round. She followed by beating former world No. 1, Maria Sharapova, in two sets. She lost to fourth-seeded Victoria Azarenka in the quarterfinals.

Voskoboeva qualified for the US Open, but lost to seventh seed Francesca Schiavone in the first round.

2012
As of 2012, Voskoboeva has paired with fellow Kazakh player Yaroslava Shvedova in doubles, in an effort to represent their nation at the Summer Olympics in London, a feat they achieved, reaching the second round.

2013

Voskoboeva began her 2013 season at the Auckland Open. She lost in the first round to Kirsten Flipkens. Coming through the qualifying rounds at the Sydney International, Voskoboeva defeated Yanina Wickmayer in the first round. She was defeated in the second round by second seed Angelique Kerber. At the Australian Open, Voskoboeva lost in the first round to 25th seed Venus Williams.

In Memphis at the National Indoor Championships, Voskoboeva was defeated in the first round by fourth seed Heather Watson.

Personal life
In 2008, Galina changed her nationality from Russian to Kazakhstani. She attended University RUPF in Moscow, where she graduated from in 2005. On 15 April 2021, she married Jonathan Gully, a physician, at the Cathedral Basilica of Saint Peter in Chains, in Cincinnati, Ohio.

Grand Slam performance timelines

Singles

Doubles

Significant finals

WTA 1000 finals

Doubles: 1 (runner-up)

WTA career finals

Singles: 1 (runner-up)

Doubles: 18 (5 titles, 13 runner-ups)

WTA 125 tournament finals

Doubles: 1 (title)

ITF Circuit finals

Singles: 8 (3 titles, 5 runner-ups)

Doubles: 23 (13 titles, 10 runner-ups)

Head-to-head records
 Serena Williams 0–2
 Venus Williams 0–1
 Lindsay Davenport 0–1
 Maria Sharapova 1–1
 Victoria Azarenka 1–2
 Caroline Wozniacki 0–1

Notes

References

External links
 
 
 
 
 

1984 births
Living people
Kazakhstani female tennis players
Tennis players from Moscow
Russian female tennis players
Tennis players at the 2012 Summer Olympics
Tennis players at the 2016 Summer Olympics
Olympic tennis players of Kazakhstan
Russian emigrants to Kazakhstan
Naturalised citizens of Kazakhstan
Naturalised tennis players